42 Camelopardalis is a single star in the constellation Camelopardalis, located roughly 770 light years away from the Sun. It is visible to the naked eye as a faint, blue-white hued star with an apparent visual magnitude of 5.14. The visual magnitude of the star is diminished by an extinction of 0.22 due to interstellar dust.

Observations made in 1933 appeared to suggest this could be a Beta Cephei variable, but this was not confirmed by follow-up measurements. The star has a stellar classification of B4 IV, matching a B-type subgiant star. It has 6.5 times the mass of the Sun and about 5.6 times the Sun's radius. 42 Camelopardalis is 50 million years old with a high rotation rate, showing a projected rotational velocity of 105 km/s. It is radiating 2,460 times the luminosity of the Sun from its photosphere at an effective temperature of 16,550 K. This star is notable as demonstrating similarities between the short-period B-type variables and the Cepheid variables.

References

B-type subgiants
Camelopardalis (constellation)
Durchmusterung objects
Camelopardalis, 42
048879
032864
2490